Fujiwara no Reishi (藤原 麗子; 1185 – November 1, 1243), also known as Ōi no Mikado Reishi (大炊御門 麗子), was an Empress consort of Japan. She was the consort of Emperor Tsuchimikado of Japan. Her honorary name was Onmei Mon'in (陰明門院).

In 1221, on the first month of the Jōkyū era she ordained as a Buddhist nun and received the Dharma name Seijōmyō (清浄妙).

Notes

Fujiwara clan
Japanese empresses
Japanese Buddhist nuns
13th-century Buddhist nuns
1185 births
1243 deaths